The Route Inn BCL, formerly known as the , is an independent minor baseball league in Japan. The league's abbreviated designation is "."

League structure 
The 72-game season runs from April–October, split into two half-terms, with the division champion from each half-term meeting in a playoff at the end of the year to determine which two teams compete for the league championship. Each team carries 27 players.

Typically, players earn 150,000 yen (c. U.S. $2,000) per month, with another 50,000 yen in potential bonuses. The league imposes a 7.2 million yen (c. U.S. $60,600) salary limit for team managers.

Not every team has a permanent home stadium. Instead, the team travels around its home prefecture, playing in different stadiums, each one called "home” for that game.

History 
The BC League began play in 2007 as the Hokushinestu Baseball Challenge League. It originally consisted of four teams based in the Hokuriku region: the Ishikawa Million Stars, the Niigata Albirex Baseball Club, the Shinano Grandserows, and the Toyama Thunderbirds. In 2008 the league added two teams, Gunma Diamond Pegasus and the Fukui Miracle Elephants, and split into two divisions, Jōshin'etsu (Gunma, Shinano, and Niigata) and Hokuriku (Fukui, Ishikawa, and Toyama).

Ishikawa Million Stars Infielder Kensuke Uchimura led the league in steals in 2007, which led to him being drafted by Nippon Professional Baseball's Rakuten Golden Eagles. In 2008, he became the first player to reach NPB after playing in the BC League.

In February 2014, the league agreed to a naming rights deal with Route Inn Group, becoming the Route Inn BC League.

That same month, it was announced that a new team, the Musashi Heat Bears, based out of Saitama Prefecture, would join the league in time for the 2015 season. In July 2014, it was announced that a second new team, the Fukushima Hopes, would also join the league for the 2015 season.

Late in the summer of 2014, along with the Shikoku Island League Plus, the Route Inn BCL formed the Japan Independent Baseball League Organization.

With the addition of two new teams, in 2015 the league realigned and renamed its divisions, replacing the previous divisions Jōshin'etsu and Hokuriku with Future—East and Advance—West. The team adopted a three-division alignment in 2020.

In September 2021, Toyama, Ishikawa, Fukui, and Shiga (the West division) announced that they would leave the league in 2022 and form a new league, the Nihonkai Ocean League.

Teams

Yearly standings

References

External links
 Baseball Challenge League Official Site (in Japanese)
 2014 Final Standings, Playoff Results, Statistical Leaders

Baseball leagues in Japan
Sports leagues established in 2007
2007 establishments in Japan
Professional sports leagues in Japan